Teruaki Suzuki (鈴木 輝昭, born February 16, 1958, in Sendai, Miyagi) is a Japanese composer known for choral compositions.

Biography
Teruaki Suzuki graduated from Toho Gakuen School of Music, where he studied under Akira Miyoshi. He has won many prestigious awards, such as first place in the 46th Nihon Ongaku Konkūru.

References 

1958 births
Academic staff of Toho Gakuen School of Music
Choral composers
Japanese classical composers
Japanese male classical composers
Living people